Helltown may refer to:
Helltown, California
Helltown, Ohio
Bathurst, New Brunswick (Colloquially, esp. East Bathurst)
Hell Town (TV series)
Born to the West, a 1937 John Wayne film reissued as Hell Town
Halifax, Nova Scotia, perhaps originally due to the nickname, "Hell," which American soldiers gave to the city when imprisoned there. Also, see the phrase "Go to Halifax!" often used as an expletive by Southerners in the novel Gone with the Wind.